Mireia Borrás Pabón is a Spanish politician and a member of the Congress of Deputies since December 2019 for the Vox  party.

Biography
She has a degree in Economics and Journalism and a Master's in Finance from Charles III University of Madrid. After graduating, she worked for KPMG in Spain and later at Ernst & Young in London. She has founded two companies that produce environmental technology, including GoiPlug which manufactures eco-friendly portable batteries. Her support of  environmental protection and decision to attend the 2019 United Nations Climate Change Conference has been highlight by some journalists due to Vox's rejection of the scientific consensus on climate change, although Pabón has not publicly commented on this.

She was elected to the Congress of Deputies in the November 2019 Spanish general election for Vox representing the Madrid constituency.

References 

1986 births
Living people
Members of the 14th Congress of Deputies (Spain)
Vox (political party) politicians
Spanish women in politics
Politicians from Madrid
Charles III University of Madrid alumni